The 2009 Serbia Open (also known as Serbia Open powered by Telekom Srbija for sponsorship reasons) was a men's tennis tournament played on outdoor clay courts. It was the first edition of the event known that year as the Serbia Open, and was a part of the ATP World Tour 250 series of the 2009 ATP World Tour. It took place at the Milan Gale Muškatirović complex in Belgrade, Serbia, from May 2 through May 10, 2009.

The singles draw was headlined by the tournament's host, Association of Tennis Professionals (ATP) No. 3, 2008 Tennis Masters Cup, Dubai winner and recent Miami, Monte Carlo and Rome runner-up Novak Djokovic from Serbia. Other featured stars included reigning Nottingham champion Ivo Karlović, and Gstaad and Umag finalist Igor Andreev. Other seeds included Andreas Seppi from Italy, Belgrade Challenger winner Viktor Troicki, Ivan Ljubičić, Arnaud Clément and Christophe Rochus.

The doubles draw was headlined by 2008 year-end World No. 1 doubles team, 2008 Tennis Masters Cup, Rotterdam, Monte Carlo, Barcelona and Rome champions Daniel Nestor and Nenad Zimonjić, both born in Belgrade (although Nestor grew up from early childhood in Canada and represents that country). Also competing were Acapulco runners-up Łukasz Kubot and Oliver Marach, Stephen Huss and Ross Hutchins, and Simon Aspelin and Paul Hanley.

Champions

Singles

 Novak Djokovic defeated  Łukasz Kubot, 6–3, 7–6(7–0)
It was Djokovic's 2nd title of the year, and his 13th overall.

Doubles

 Łukasz Kubot /  Oliver Marach defeated  Johan Brunström /  Jean-Julien Rojer, 6–2, 7–6(7–3)

Entrants

Seeds

 Seedings are based on the rankings of April 27, 2009.

Other entrants
The following players received wildcards into the main draw:
  Filip Krajinović
  Arsenije Zlatanović
  Marcos Baghdatis

The following players received entry from the qualifying draw:
  Victor Crivoi
  Flavio Cipolla
  Santiago Ventura
  Dominik Hrbatý
  Łukasz Kubot (lucky loser)

External links
Official website 
Singles Draw
Doubles Draw
Qualifying Singles Draw

 
Serbia
2009 in Serbian sport